Sebastian Díaz Villán (born June 28, 1983 in Montevideo), commonly known as Sebastian Díaz, is a Uruguayan retired footballer who played as a centre back. He is currently the assistant manager of Plaza Colonia.

Coaching career
Díaz decided to retire at the end of the 2018/19 season, but continued at Plaza Colonia as the technical assistant manager of manager Matías Rosa.

References

External links
 Profile at soccerway
 Profile at footballdatabase.eu

1983 births
Living people
Uruguayan footballers
Uruguayan expatriate footballers
Association football defenders
Liga Nacional de Fútbol de Guatemala players
Uruguayan Primera División players
Uruguayan Segunda División players
Primera Nacional players
Primera B Metropolitana players
Central Español players
Defensor Sporting players
Racing Club de Montevideo players
Club Atlético Huracán footballers
Gimnasia y Esgrima de Jujuy footballers
Comunicaciones F.C. players
Deportivo Merlo footballers
Club Atlético Atlanta footballers
Sportivo Italiano footballers
Club Plaza Colonia de Deportes players
Footballers from Montevideo
Expatriate footballers in Argentina
Uruguayan expatriate sportspeople in Argentina
Expatriate footballers in Guatemala
Uruguayan expatriate sportspeople in Guatemala